The Accademia Filarmonica may refer to:

 The Accademia Filarmonica di Bologna
 The Accademia Filarmonica di Verona